Gigi is a 1951 play written by Anita Loos. It is based on Colette's 1944 novel of the same name, and was produced on Broadway, where it starred Audrey Hepburn in the title role.

Plot
The play's plot generally follows that of the original story, focusing on a young 19th century Parisian girl being groomed for a career as a courtesan.  Gigi lives with her mother and grandmother, and takes lessons at the home of her aunt.  Her lessons include social manners, conversation, and personal relationships.  The family has significant social connections, and have been great friends with the rich playboy Gaston.  Gaston is bored with his life, and his only joy seems to be in the company of Gigi and her family.
  
Aunt Alicia decides that the time is right for Gigi's entry into society.  After dressing her up, she is presented to Gaston as a young woman.  He is, at first, dismayed at the change.  Gradually he realizes that he is attracted to Gigi, and takes her out on the town.  As the night progresses, Gaston sees the emptiness of his life and wants something more.  He proposes marriage to Gigi, and she gladly accepts.

Opening night production credits

(Fulton) Theatre Owned / Operated by City Playhouses, Inc.(Louis A. Lotito, President)
Produced by Gilbert Miller
Written by Anita Loos; Adapted from the novel by Colette; Music selected by Alexander Haas
Directed by Raymond Rouleau
Scenic Design by Raymond Sovey
General manager: Morton Gottlieb
Company Manager: D'Arcy Miller
Stage Manager: Richard Bender
Assistant Stage Mgr: Ronald Telfer
Technical Consultant to Mr. Rouleau: Lila de Nobili
Press Representative: Richard Maney and Frank Goodman
Special Promotion: Arthur Cantor

Opening night cast

Audrey Hepburn ... Gigi
Cathleen Nesbitt ... Alicia de St. Ephlam, Gigi's Aunt   
Doris Patson ... Andree, Gigi's Mother
Josephine Brown ... Madame Alvarez, Gigi's Grandmother
Bertha Belmore ... Sidonie
Michael Evans ... Gaston Lachaille
Francis Compton ... Victor

See also
 Gigi (1949 film)
 Gigi (1958 film)
 Gigi (musical)

References

External links

1951 plays
Plays by Anita Loos
Broadway plays
Plays based on novels
Plays set in France
Paris in fiction
Colette